Cheiragonidae is a small family of crabs, sometimes called helmet crabs, placed in its own superfamily, Cheriagonoidea. It comprises three extant species, Erimacrus isenbeckii, Telmessus acutidens and Telmessus cheiragonus, there are no yet evidences of Cheiragonidae in the fossil record. Many of these crabs were formerly treated as members of the Atelecyclidae.

References

External links

Crabs
Extant Eocene first appearances
Decapod families